Laura Baldwin may refer to:

 Laura Spencer (General Hospital), formerly Baldwin, a fictional character on the ABC soap opera General Hospital
 Laura Baldwin (sailor) (born 1980), British sailor
 Laura Baldwin, British actress